Carnarvonia araliifolia, commonly known as the red oak, red silky oak, Caledonian oak or elephant's foot, is the sole species in the monotypic genus Carnarvonia, a member of the Proteaceae plant family. It is endemic to the rainforests of northeastern Queensland.

Description
These may give the lower trunk the appearance of an elephant's foot, and are the source of one of the common names for the species. The trunk bears numerous, closely spaced small lenticels.

The large leaves are pedately compound and highly variable, having anything from 3 to 20 leaflets. The leaves are arranged alternately on the branches.

The inflorescence is a panicle, produced either terminally, in the leaf axils, directly from the branches, or on the trunk. They develop between November to May.

Taxonomy
This species was first described by the German-born Australian botanist Ferdinand von Mueller, from a specimen collected by John Dallachy in the forested mountains around Rockingham's Bay in Far North Queensland. He published the description in volume 6 of his massive work Fragmenta phytographiae Australiae in 1867.

In 1995 the Australian botanist Bernard Hyland described a new variety of the species, C. a. var. montana, which was published in Flora of Australia volume 16. His description was based on a specimen he collected himself in 1972

Phylogeny
The species has been placed in the subfamily Grevilleoideae because its cotyledons have auricles, which is unique to the subfamily.

Etymology
The genus name Carnarvonia was given by Mueller to honour Henry Howard Molyneux Herbert, the Fourth Earl of Carnarvon. The species epithet araliifolia is a combination of the genus Aralia and the Latin word folium, "leaf", and refers to the similarity of the leaves to those of some Aralia species.

Distribution and habitat
Both varieties grow in well developed rainforest

Ecology
The fruits are eaten by Sulphur-crested cockatoos (Cacatua galerita) and cassowaries (Casuarius casuarius).

Conservation
This species is listed by both the Queensland Department of Environment and Science and the IUCN as least concern.

Uses
The timber of C. araliifolia has a rich red colour and is hard wearing. It has been used in house construction, especially for polished floors.

Gallery

References

External links
 
 
 View a map of historical sightings of this species at the Australasian Virtual Herbarium
 View observations of this species on iNaturalist
 View images of this species on Flickriver

Proteaceae
Proteales of Australia
Trees of Australia
Taxa named by Ferdinand von Mueller
Taxa described in 1867
Endemic flora of Queensland
Wet Tropics of Queensland